Yonder is a  South Korean web series starring Shin Ha-kyun and Han Ji-min. It premiered in TVING on October 14, 2022.

Synopsis 
A story that happens when a man who receives a message from his dead wife is invited to 'yonder,' an unknown space where he can meet her for the last time.

Cast 
 Shin Ha-kyun as Ja-hyun
 Han Ji-min as Ye-hoo 
 Lee Jung-eun as Se-rin
 Jung Jin-Young as Doctor K 
  Bae Yu-ram as Pro Park 
 Choi Dae-sung
 Cha Soon-bae
 Yoon Yi-re as Peach
 Choi Hee-seo as AI Seri 
 Jo Bo-bi as Joeun

Production and release 
This was TVING and Paramount+ first co-produced Korean series under their recent partnership between CJ ENM and Paramount Global.

On September 7, 2022, it was confirmed that the series will premiere at the 27th Busan International Film Festival in the "On Screen" section.

Yonder will set to be premiered outside Korea (alongside Japan and Taiwan, where TVING set to be launched) on Paramount+ in 2023.

References

External links 
  
 
 

Korean-language television shows
Paramount+ original programming
2022 South Korean television series debuts
2022 South Korean television series endings
TVING original programming
Television series by CJ E&M
2022 web series debuts
South Korean web series
South Korean drama web series